China Rattus coronavirus HKU24 is a species of coronavirus in the genus Betacoronavirus.

References

Betacoronaviruses